The 2000 National Camogie League is a competition in the women's’ team field sport of camogie was won by Cork, who defeated Tipperary in the final, played at O'Connor Park, Tullamore.

Arrangements
Tipperary easily defeated Armagh and Derry and overcame an inexperienced Kilkenny team before they defeated Galway after extra time in a closely fought semi-final. Cork defeated Armagh, Galway (twice), Kilkenny and Tipperary en route to the final.

The Final
The pattern of the final was set once Fiona O'Driscoll placed the ball past Jovita Delaney in the Tipp goal in the first minute of the second half. Playing with a strong wind, Tipperary confined Cork to one point from a free in the first half while sending over seven of their own. Cork had equalized by the 53rd minute and pulled away with a goal from Ciara Walsh, who had scored 1-6 against Kildare in the junior final which had preceded the senior final. Shortly afterwards Fiona O'Driscoll’s lobbed shot went all the way to the Tipp net.

Division 2
The Junior National League, known since 2006 as Division Two, was won by Cork intermediates who defeated Laois in the final.

Final stages

References

External links
 Camogie Association

National Camogie League
2000